Heteroclinus antinectes, the Natal weedfish, is a species of clinid found in the Indian Ocean waters off of Australia. It is endemic to Shark Bay in Western Australia.

References

antinectes
Taxa named by Albert Günther
Fish described in 1861